Door To Door Storage was a self-storage company which provided a self-storage box service for customers to fill at their premises. It was acquired in May 2017 by U-Haul. The company delivers the storage boxes which customers load and then ships the boxes to their storage facilities.

Door To Door Storage was founded in Kent, Washington, in May 1996 by Tim Riley, a first-time entrepreneur who had previously worked for Shurgard Storage Centers. The company has locations in metropolitan areas all across the U.S., from Washington to Florida and California to New Hampshire.

Each will typically accommodate one to one-and-one-half rooms of household goods.

References

External links

 

Storage companies
Companies based in Kent, Washington
Real estate companies established in 1996
Transport companies established in 1996
2017 mergers and acquisitions